The St. Joseph Park and Parkway System is a national historic district located at St. Joseph, Missouri. It is St. Joseph, Missouri's hiking and biking Parkway ribbons through the city for 26 miles. Developed in 1918 by internationally known landscape architect George Burnap, St. Joseph was one of the first cities in the United States to develop a comprehensive parkway plan. Popular for hiking and biking activities, the completed system connects principal parks and recreation facilities, providing a "green belt" throughout the city. 

St. Joseph's Parkway system was listed in the National Register of Historic Places in 1994.

See also
Krug Park

References

External links
 St. Joseph Parks, Recreation, and Civic Facilities

Historic districts on the National Register of Historic Places in Missouri
Renaissance Revival architecture in Missouri
Protected areas of Buchanan County, Missouri
Historic districts in St. Joseph, Missouri
National Register of Historic Places in Buchanan County, Missouri